Miroidea is a superfamily of true bugs in the order Hemiptera. There are about 7 families and more than 15,000 described species in Miroidea.

Families
These seven families belong to the superfamily Miroidea:
 Microphysidae Dohrn, 1859
 Miridae (plant bugs)
 Thaumastocoridae Kirkaldy, 1908
 Tingidae (lace bugs)
 † Berstidae Tihelka et al., 2020
 † Ebboidae Perrichot et al., 2006
 † Hispanocaderidae Golub and Popov, 2012
 † Ignotingidae Zhang et al., 2005

References

Further reading

 
 
 
 
 

Cimicomorpha
Hemiptera superfamilies